khomar (also Romanized as khomār) is a village in Rivand Rural District, in the Central District of Nishapur County, Razavi Khorasan Province, Iran.

References 

Populated places in Nishapur County